Venod Sharma (born 10 January 1948) is an Indian politician and the founder of the Jan Chetna Party. He was student leader and associated with INC student outfit NSUI. He made it into political mainstream when he was elected as MLA from Banur in 1980 Punjab assembly election. In next assembly elections he lost to Kanwaljit Singh. He was formerly a member of the Indian National Congress, which he represented as a Member of Legislative Assembly (1980) from Banur, Punjab then Member of Parliament in the Rajya Sabha (1992–1998) and as a Member of Legislative Assembly (2005–2014) from Ambala, Haryana.

Sharma was associated with the Indian National Congress (INC) for 40 years.

In 1999, he resigned from the Indian National Congress during 1999 Indian general election after his son Manu Sharma was accused in the Jessica Lal murder case and he allegedly tried to bribe a witness. Sharma returned into Congress in 2004 and won the 2005 Haryana Legislative Assembly election from Ambala city. He was re-elected from the same constituency in 2009.

On 19 April 2014, Sharma was expelled from the Indian National Congress, for campaigning against it in the recent elections. On 2 May 2014, he resigned as a Member of the Haryana Legislative Assembly and on 23 June he founded his own political party, Haryana Jan Chetna Party (V). It was alleged that his decision to quit was motivated by a desire to protect his corporate interests.

Sharma and his wife, Shakti Rani Sharma, contested the 2014 Haryana state election and lost it to BJP candidates. There were allegations of Poll Code violations by Sharma during the elections.

References

Living people
Haryana MLAs 2009–2014
1948 births
Rajya Sabha members from Haryana
Indian National Congress politicians
Rajya Sabha members from Punjab, India
Members of the Assam Legislative Assembly
People from Ambala